James Kops is a Papua New Guinean rugby league footballer who represented Papua New Guinea at the 1995 World Cup.

Playing career
From the Hagen Eagles club, Kops first played for Papua New Guinea in 1995 at the World Cup. He went on to play in six test matches, his last in 2001.

In 2001 he moved clubs, joining the Enga Mioks.

References

Living people
Papua New Guinean rugby league players
Papua New Guinean sportsmen
Papua New Guinea national rugby league team players
Hagen Eagles players
Rugby league wingers
Enga Mioks players
Year of birth missing (living people)
Place of birth missing (living people)